TBA Studios is a Philippine independent production company. Co-founded by Fernando Ortigas and EA Rocha, it is an aggrupation of three independent film productions: Tuko Film Productions, Buchi Boy Entertainment, and Artikulo Uno Productions.

Filmography
Films produced and/or distributed by TBA Studios.

Pre-TBA

2016–present

International Films

References

External links

List of Artikulo Uno Films Movies at IMDB.Com

Film production companies of the Philippines
Philippine film studios
Mass media companies established in 2017
Philippine companies established in 2017